Czesław Łuczak (born 19 February 1922 in Kruszwica – 10 August 2002 in Poznań) was a Polish historian focusing on World War II. He served as Rector of the Adam Mickiewicz University in Poznań from 1965 to 1972; and, from 1969 to 1981 and from 1987 to 1991, as Director of the University's Institute of History. He was a member of the Polish United Workers' Party in communist Poland.

As scholar, he specialized in the modern economic history of Poland, Germany and Polish-German relations. He published over 50 books and hundreds of articles.

Selected publications
 "Kraj Warty" 1939-1945. Studium historyczno-gospodarcze okupacji hitlerowskiej (1972)
 Polscy robotnicy przymusowi w Trzeciej Rzeszy podczas II wojny światowej (1974)
 Polityka ludnościowa i ekonomiczna hitlerowskich Niemiec w okupowanej Polsce, Wyd. Poznańskie, Poznań 1979 
 Polityka ekonomiczna III Rzeszy w latach drugiej wojny światowej (1982)
 Dzieje gospodarcze Niemiec 1871–1945 (1984)
 Dzieje gospodarcze Wielkopolski w okresie zaborów 1815-1918 (1988)
 Od Bismarcka do Hitlera : polsko-niemieckie stosunki gospodarcze (1988)
 Zagłada (1989)
 Dzień po dniu w okupowanym Poznaniu (1989)
 Dzień po dniu w okupowanej Wielkopolsce i na Ziemi Łódzkiej (Kraj Warty) (1989)
 Praca przymusowa Polaków w III Rzeszy (1989)
 Polska i Polacy w drugiej wojnie światowej (1993)
 Dzieje Mogilna (1998)
 Historia gospodarcza Niemiec lat 1871-1990 (2002)

Notes

References
 Antoni Czubiński, Wspomnienie pośmiertne. Czesław Łuczak (1922-2002), "Studia Historica Slavo-Germanica", t. 24 (2001-2002), s. 279-281.
 Dariusz Matelski, Czesław Łuczak (1922-2002), „Ziemia Kujawska”, tom 15, 2002, s. 251-257.
 Dariusz Matelski, Czesław Łuczak (1922-2002), „Poznański Rocznik Historyczno-Archiwalny”, tom VIII-IX, Poznań 2002, s. 326-332.

1922 births
2002 deaths
20th-century Polish historians
Polish male non-fiction writers
Recipients of the State Award Badge (Poland)
Academic staff of Adam Mickiewicz University in Poznań